Raja Digambar Mitra (1817–1879) was one of the leading Derozians and first Bengali Sheriff of Kolkata.

Birth and Ancestry

Babu Digambar Mitra, later known as Raja Digambar Mitra, was born in 1817 at Konnagar in the district of Hooghly of present-day West Bengal into a Kulin Kayastha family.

This wealthy and respectable family of Konnagar was locally known as the Mandir-Bati-Mitra family. Raja Digambar Mitra's grandfather Ram Chandra Mitra was a cashier in a Calcutta based mercantile firm. He had three sons namely Shib Chandra Mitra, Shambhu Chandra Mitra and Raj Krishna Mitra, Shib Chandra being the eldest among all of the three. All of them were employed in the same firm as their father. Shib Chandra Mitra had two sons. His eldest son was Raja Digambar Mitra. In the later years, Shib Chandra bought a house in Sovabazar, North Calcutta. Raja Digambar Mitra spend his childhood at Calcutta.

Life
The son of Shib Chandra Mitra of Konnagar in Hooghly district of present-day West Bengal, he was educated at Hare School and Hindu College and was one of the leading disciples of Henry Louis Vivian Derozio.

He worked as teacher, clerk, tehsildar and zemindari estate manager before earning well from share business and became a zemindar. As manager of the Cossimbazar Raj, he was awarded  Rupees one lakh for his innovative efforts. He invested the money in cotton and indigo business and became rich.

An orthodox person he opposed the introduction of widow remarriage.

He was awarded CSI in 1876 and made Raja in 1877.

One of his sons was the illustrious Kumar Manmatha Nath Mitra Rai Bahadur of Shyampukur, well known for his extensive knowledge of European fine art and precious gemstones, and the trading in these items. Shyampukur Rajbati once housed the largest Bohemian crystal chandelier in Calcutta.

References

1817 births
1879 deaths
Hare School alumni
Businesspeople from Kolkata
Sheriffs of Kolkata
Companions of the Order of the Star of India